BRFM (The Border Drive) is a South African radio station.

The station received a broadcast license from ICASA.

Listenership Figures

References

External links
SAARF Website
Sentech Website

Radio stations in South Africa